This is the list of Belgian Senators from 2007 until the federal election of 2010, which was the 52nd legislature of the Senate.

Seat division

Bureau

President and Vice-Presidents

College of Quaestors

Floor leaders

List

Senators by Right

References

2000s in Belgium
2010 in Belgium